The 1820 United States presidential election in New Hampshire took place between November 1 and December 6, 1820, as part of the 1820 United States presidential election.

During this election, the Democratic-Republican Party was the only major national party, and its candidate of choice was James Monroe, the current president. New Hampshire's eight electors were chosen by voters statewide, and all of them voted for James Monroe and his running mate, Vice President Daniel D. Tompkins, except for one who gave his electoral votes to John Quincy Adams and Richard Rush.

Results

See also
 United States presidential elections in New Hampshire

References

New Hampshire
1820
1820 New Hampshire elections